The VinFuture Prize is an annual international award that honors remarkable scientific breakthroughs and promotes innovations for mankind, with involvement from world-renowned scientists, policymakers, business leaders, and Prize holders. It is the first influential and worldwide prize to be founded in Vietnam, and it is hosted by the VinFuture Foundation.

The vision of the VinFuture Prize is to catalyze meaningful change in people’s everyday lives through tangible and highly scalable improvements in areas such as productivity, prosperity, connectivity, health, safety, environment, sustainability, as well as their overall happiness regardless of socioeconomic status.

History

Establishment
Since 2017, Vietnam has been working to integrate a more comprehensive STEM education and encourage more individuals to pursue careers in the area. With an influx of STEM students in colleges and internationally trained professionals, Vietnam has enormous potential in science and technology. Vietnam has gained widespread praise from the international scientific community for its recent exceptional efforts in the battle against the COVID-19 pandemic. However, scientific research and development in Vietnam continue to encounter various obstacles, including a lack of funds, support, and infrastructure. VinGroup, one of the most powerful Vietnamese conglomerates, is investing in the world's most extraordinary brains in the STEM field with the launch of VinFuture Foundation in 2020, in order to help leverage Vietnam's position on the global science map.

Founders
Chairman Phạm Nhật Vượng and his wife, Mrs. Phạm Thu Hương, founded the VinFuture Foundation as an independent organization with the mission of honoring breakthrough innovations in science and technology that have the potential to change the lives of millions of people in Vietnam and around the world. With the annual worldwide award - VinFuture Prize – marking its inaugural event in 2021, the Foundation hopes to honor and inspire such innovations.

The VinFuture Prize Council
The VinFuture Prize Council is a global and diverse team of distinguished individuals from academia, research, and industry, all of whom are globally renowned for their achievements in advancing human progress and contributions in the fields of science, technology, and industry. The Prize Council is responsible for reviewing and ratifying the fields of focus and the selection process, as well as selecting the VinFuture Laureates 

Professor Sir Richard Henry Friend: Cavendish Professorship of Physics at the University of Cambridge, Director of the Winton Programme for the Physics of Sustainability and of the Maxwell Centre, a Tan Chin Tuan Centennial Professor at the National University of Singapore and serves as Chairman of the Scientific Advisory Board of the National Research Foundation (NRF) of Singapore, one of the principal investigators in the new Cambridge-based Interdisciplinary Research Collaboration (IRC) on nanotechnology and co-founder of Cambridge Display Technology (CDT) and Plastic Logic.

Doctor Padmanabhan AAnandan: a renowned researcher in Computer Vision and Artificial Intelligence with more than 60 publications earning over 14,500 citations in Google Scholar.

Professor Jennifer Tour Chayes: Associate Provost of Computing, Data Science, and Society, and Dean of the School of Information at UC Berkeley, as well as 
Professor in four UC Berkeley departments: Electrical Engineering and Computer Sciences, Information, Mathematics, and Statistics.

Professor Pascale Cossart: Professor Emeritus and Head of the Cell Department of the Pasteur Institute, is a pioneering cellular microbiologist who has made significant contributions to our understanding of how bacteria both infect, and survive within, host cells.

Professor Chi Van Dang: Scientific Director, Ludwig Institute for Cancer Research, is awarded a Ph.D. in Chemistry (high distinction) from Georgetown University and considered a world pioneer in interdisciplinary research between Biology and Cancer.

Doctor Xuedong Huang: leading computer scientist and technology executive in AI and Spoken Language Processing, currently a Microsoft Technical Fellow and Chief Technology Officer overseeing Microsoft Azure AI engineering and research He was named by Wired Magazine as one of the “25 Geniuses Who Created Future Business Trends”.

Professor Daniel Kammen: serves as James and Katherine Lau Distinguished Professor of Sustainability at University of California, Berkeley (USA) with parallel appointments in the Energy and Resources, the Goldman School of Public Policy, and the Department of Nuclear Engineering.

Professor Gérard Albert Mourou:  a professor and member of Haut Collège at the École Polytechnique, and A. D. Moore Distinguished University Professor Emeritus at the University of Michigan, the winner of the 2018 Nobel Prize in Physics for his work with his doctoral student, Donna Strickland, on generating ultrashort high-intensity laser pulses without destroying the amplifying material.

Professor Sir Konstantin Sergeevich Novoselov FRS: born in Russia in August 1974 and has dual British and Russian citizenship. He is best known for isolating graphene at The University of Manchester in 2004 and is an expert in condensed matter physics, mesoscopic physics, and nanotechnology.

Professor Michael Eugene Porter: the Bishop William Lawrence University Professor at the Harvard Business School. He is an economist, researcher, author, teacher, strategy advisor, and speaker.

Professor Leslie Gabriel Valiant, FRS: a British-American computer scientist and computational theorist who is currently the T. Jefferson Coolidge Professor of Computer Science and Applied Mathematics at Harvard University.

Professor Vu Ha Van: Percey F. Smith Position Professor of Mathematics and Professor of Data Science at Yale University, known for his work on combinatorial and combinatorial arithmetic, random matrix theory, and their applications in computational science.

The VinFuture Pre-screening Committee
The VinFuture Pre-screening Committee is a diverse team of well-established individuals from varied fields of academia, science, technology, and industry. The Pre-screening Committee is responsible for reviewing and identifying qualified nominations in accordance with the selection criteria set by the Prize Council and preparing supporting documents for the shortlist before presenting them to the Prize Council.

Professor Thuc-Quyen Nguyen: a Professor in the Department of Chemistry & Biochemistry at the University of California, Santa Barbara (UCSB), a research associate in the Department of Chemistry and the Nano Center at Columbia University.

Professor Albert P. Pisano: an American academic who has served as Dean of the Jacobs School of Engineering at the University of California San Diego (UC San Diego) since September 2013.

Professor Myles Allen: Professor of Geosystem Science in the School of Geography and the Environment and Department of Physics at the University of Oxford.

Professor Ermias Kebreab: Associate Dean for Global Engagement in the College of Agricultural and Environmental Sciences, as well as Director of the World Food Center, University of California, Davis.

Professor Quarraisha Abdool Karim: Scientific Director of CAPRISA and Pro-Vice Chancellor for African Health at the University of KwaZulu-Natal in South Africa, and a Professor in Clinical Epidemiology at the Mailman School of Public Health, Columbia University, USA.

Professor Monica Alonso Cotta: obtained her B.Sc. and PhD in Physics from University of Campinas, Brazil and was a postdoctoral fellow at AT&T Bell Laboratories, USA; a full professor and currently associate director of the Institute of Physics “Gleb Wataghin” at the University of Campinas, Brazil.

Professor Do Ngoc Minh: Professor in the Department of Electrical and Computer Engineering at the University of Illinois at Urbana-Champaign (UIUC) and is currently serving as the Vice Provost of VinUniversity.

Mr. Akihisa Kakimoto: CTO, Mitsubishi Chemical Corporation.

Professor Nguyen Duc Thu: Professor of Computer Science and Dean of the Division of Mathematical and Physical Sciences in the School of Arts and Sciences at Rutgers University (USA).

Professor Molly Shoichet: University Professor, the University of Toronto’s highest academic rank and a distinction held by less than 2% of the faculty.

Professor Alta Schutte: Professor and Principal Lead of the Cardiac, Vascular and Metabolic Medicine Theme in the Faculty of Medicine at the University of New South Wales, Sydney, Australia.

Professor Vivian Yam: Philip Wong Wilson Wong Professor in Chemistry and Energy and Chair Professor of Chemistry at The University of Hong Kong.

Award process

Nomination
Many nominations were compiled and qualified by the VinFuture Prize Secretariat, well-known scientists in natural science, health science, agriculture, Earth science, environmental science, computer science, and engineering – technology, along with experts in artificial intelligence, renewable energy, biotechnology, new materials, environmental conservation, and other fields, prior to the Pre-screening Round. Compilation and qualification checks are crucial steps in the process of validating each nomination's eligibility and fulfillment, as well as gathering meaningful and diverse data for the overall evaluations. To guarantee scientific integrity, impartiality, and openness, all nominations will be evaluated using rigorous international standards-based review methods. The reward is open to anybody from anywhere, regardless of nationality, gender, age, or economic status.

The nominations will be evaluated by the VinFuture Prize Pre-screening Committee, which is made up of prestigious scientists and experts from leading universities, research institutions, technological and industrial organizations around the world, based on three core criteria: scientific and technological advancement, meaningful changes in people's lives, and scale of impact and sustainability. The 17 Sustainable Development Goals of the United Nations, together with VinFuture's purpose of making substantial improvements in the lives of millions of people, must be adhered to by the selected candidates.

Selection
The VinFuture Prize Council will assess the process and choose four ground-breaking scientific discoveries that have had and will continue to have a beneficial impact on millions of people across the world. They are required to make reasonable conclusions based on a variety of perspectives and in consideration of all professional disciplines, scientific domains, and civilizations. Prize winners will be announced at the VinFuture Prize Award Ceremony.

Annually, the VinFuture Prize awards a total of four prizes, including the Grand Prize and three special prizes. The Grand Prize gives $3 million to groundbreaking research or creative technological advancements that improve human lives and enhance equitability and sustainability for future generations. The following are the three special awards, each of which will get $500,000 in financing:
 Special Prize for an excellent researcher or innovator from a developing nation institute.
 Special Prize for an outstanding female researcher or innovator.
 Special Prize for groundbreaking discovery or invention in an emerging field of science or technology that has the potential to make a substantial beneficial impact on mankind in the future.

Award ceremony
The Sci-Tech Week and VinFuture Award Ceremony will be held on an annual basis, helping to promote Vietnam as a new destination for global science and technology and laying the groundwork for a multilateral link between Vietnam's scientific and technological community and the rest of the globe.

The Sci-Tech Week
The VinFuture Sci-Tech Week is a major event that draws thousands of scientists, politicians, and entrepreneurs from all over the world. World-renowned influential scientists will convene in Vietnam to participate in the VinFuture Sci-Tech Week's four main events: a conversation with the Prize Council and Pre-screening Committee, a "Science for Life" Symposium, the inaugural VinFuture Award Ceremony, and a Scientific Dialogue with the inaugural VinFuture Prize Laureates.

The VinFuture Award Ceremony
The VinFuture Award Ceremony will be a formal event attended by Vietnamese government leaders, world-renowned scientists, and recipients of prominent scientific honors such as the Nobel Prize, Millennium Technology Prize, Turing Award, and others. The Award Ceremony will be broadcast live on locally as well as globally science and technology platforms.

Laureates

Reception
Professor Sir Richard Henry Friend, Chairman of the VinFuture Prize Council and the Cavendish Professorship of Physics at the University of Cambridge (UK), said: "I am really impressed by the very constructive response from the nominators. We clearly have a broad set of really interesting and exciting nominations. I think there has been real enthusiasm from nominators across the whole world about this prize. That is certainly the impression I have picked up from the enquiries I have received. The connection between science discovery and real impact on everyday lives is really welcomed.". "I think that science and technology play a very central role in the development of both economies and societies. The scientific approach has underpinned huge increases in living standards and has allowed unprecedented access to education for all.  It does support new businesses, and it does also inform societies about steps that have to be taken in the future.", said also Prof. Friend.

Nobel Prize Laureate Sir Konstantin Novoselov commented: "VinFuture Prize will contribute to the promotion of diversity and inclusion in the global scientific community".

Experts' views
1. Professor Sir Kostya S. Novoselov FRS, Nobel Laureate in Physics 2010, University of Manchester, UK:
"It often happens that scientists from developing countries do not get the recognition they deserve simply because their voice is not heard as well as it deserved to be heard. VinFuture Prize was developed exactly to change this, to equilibriate the situation.

2. Professor Gerald Albert Mourou, Nobel Laureate in Physics 2018, École Polytechnique University, Palaiseau, France:
"VinFuture Prize fosters the passion for science and its development in nations worldwide, which helps draw the attention of both scientific community and university students".

3. Dr. Padmanabhan Anandan, AI Matters Advisor LLC:
"There's no limit to science and I believe that VinFuture Prize will be a major motivation for scientific research".

4. Professor Jennifer Tour Chayes, University of California, Berkeley:
"VinFuture prize is the new vanguard: It's the first of the major prizes to focus on the impact to humanity so explicitly, focusing on how science and technology can create a better world for all. This is a major prize at the level of the Nobel, Millenium, and Turing"
"I am really convinced by the purpose that VinFuture is aiming for. It is to recognize the achievements of scientists, to become a bridge so that young women and scientists from developing countries can be conquering vast fields of science and technology. The next reason why I accepted the offer was that there were members of the award committee who had received Nobel or Turing prizes. It was an honor to work with them. The last reason is because VinFuture is an award from Vietnam. I have a good impression of Vietnam through friends and students from this country. I think the fact that this award originated in Vietnam is something to look forward to."

5. Professor Nguyen Thuc Quyen: Co-Chair of the Preliminary Committee, Professor of Chemistry and Biochemistry Department of University of California Santa Barbara, USA: "In my opinion, these are really very 'special' awards. Until now, there have been very few awards of great caliber and great value for research authors who are women or come from different countries. Therefore, recognizing the contributions of this group of scientists through the VinFuture award will help bridge the gap in scientific research, and everyone in the world will benefit from the work."

See also

 Japan Prize
 Nobel Prize
 Tang Prize
 Breakthrough Prize
 Turing Award

References

External links
 

Vingroup
Academic awards
2020 establishments in Vietnam
Science and technology in Vietnam
Vietnamese science and technology awards
Science awards honoring women
Awards established in 2020
Awards by type of recipient
2020 in science
International awards
2020s awards